Ferenc Szabadváry (1 September 1923 – 21 May 2006) was a Hungarian chemist and historian. From 1971 he was director at the Hungarian National Museum for Science and Technology.

In 1960 he published a history of analytical chemistry in Hungarian. A translation was made by Gyula Svehla in 1966, first published with Pergamon Press and later Gordon and Breach.

Szabadváry received the Dexter Award in 1970.

References

1923 births
2006 deaths
Hungarian chemists
Historians of chemistry
20th-century Hungarian historians